Derecik may refer to:

 Derecik, Arhavi
 Derecik, Hakkâri
 Derecik District, Hakkâri Province
 Derecik, Muş
 Derecik, Mustafakemalpaşa